Peponis may refer to:
                             
Anastasios Peponis
George Peponis
Anadevidia peponis, a moth of the family Noctuidae